Solanum bellum is a species of plant in the family Solanaceae. It is endemic to Ecuador.

References

Flora of Ecuador
bellum
Near threatened plants
Taxonomy articles created by Polbot